The Gorani or Goranci, are a Slavic Muslim ethnic group inhabiting the Gora region—the triangle between Kosovo, Albania, and North Macedonia. They number an estimated 60,000 people, and speak a transitional South Slavic dialect, called Goranski. The vast majority of the Gorani people adhere to Sunni Islam.

Name 
The ethnonym Goranci, meaning "highlanders", is derived from the Slavic toponym gora, which means "hill, mountain". Another autonym of this people is Našinci, which literally means "our people, our ones".

In Macedonian sources, the Gorani are sometimes called Torbeši, a term used for Muslim Macedonians.

In the Albanian language, they are known as Goranët and sometimes by other exonyms, such as Bulgareci ("Bulgarians"), Torbesh ("bag carriers") and Poturë ("turkified", from po-tur, literally not Turk but, "turkified", used for Islamized Slavs).

Population 

Some of the local Gorani people have over time also self declared themselves as Serbs, Albanians, Macedonians, Bosniaks, Muslim Bulgarians, Turks, or just as Muslims, due to geopolitical circumstances and in censuses.

In Kosovo, the Gorani number 10,265 inhabitants, which is drastically lower than before the Kosovo War. In 1998, it was estimated that their total population number was at least 50,000.

Settlements

In Albania, there are nine  Gorani-inhabited villages: Zapod, Pakisht, Orçikël, Kosharisht, Cernalevë, Orgjost, Oreshkë, Borje and Shishtavec.

In Kosovo, there are 18 Gorani-inhabited villages: Baćka, Brod, Vranište, Globočice, Gornja Rapča, Gornji Krstac, Dikance, Donja Rapča, Donji Krstac, Zli Potok, Kruševo, Kukaljane, Lještane, Ljubošta, Mlike, Orčuša, Radeša, and Restelica, plus the town of Dragaš.

Following 1999, Dragaš has a mixed population of Gorani, who live in the lower neighbourhood, and Albanians in the upper neighbourhood constituting the majority of inhabitants.

In North Macedonia, there are two Gorani-inhabited villages located in the Polog region: Jelovjane and Urvič.

History

Contemporary
The Gora municipality and Opoja region remained separated during the Milošević period. After the war, the Gorani-majority Gora municipality was merged with the Albanian inhabited Opoja region to form the municipality of Dragaš by the United Nations Mission (UNMIK) and the new administrative unit has an Albanian majority.

In 2007 the Kosovar provisional institutions opened a school in Gora to teach the Bosnian language, which sparked minor consternation amongst the Gorani population. Many Gorani refuse to send their children to school due to societal prejudices, and threats of assimilation to Bosniaks or Albanians. Consequently, Gorani organized education per Serbia's curriculum.

Gorani activists in Serbia's proper stated they want Gora (a former municipality) to join the Association of Serb Municipalities, causing added pressure on the Gorani Community in Kosovo.

In 2018 Bulgarian activists among Gorani have filed a petition in the country's parliament demanding their official recognition as a separate minority.

Most Gorani state that the unstable situation and economic issues drive them to leave Kosovo. There is also some mention of threats and discrimination by ethnic Albanians.

Apart from the multiethnic town of Dragash, the Gorani of Kosovo continue to live in villages primarily inhabited by their community and relations with Albanians remain tense. Mixed marriage between both communities do not occur with the exception of a few Gorani families that have migrated to Prizren.

Culture

Religion

In the 18th century, a wave of Islamization began in Gora. The Ottoman abolition of the Bulgarian Archbishopric of Ohrid and Serbian Patriarchate of Peć in 1766/1767 is thought to have prompted the Islamization of Gora as was the trend of many Balkan communities. The last Christian Gorani, Božana, died in the 19th century – she has received a cult, signifying the Gorani's Christian heritage, collected by Russian consuls Anastasiev and Yastrebov in the second half of the 19th century.

Traditions
The Gorani are known for being "the best confectioners and bakers" in former Yugoslavia.

The Slavs of Gora were Christianized after 864 when Bulgaria adopted Christianity. The Ottomans conquered the region in the 14th century, which started the process of Islamization of the Gorani and neighbouring Albanians. However, the Gorani still tangentially observe some Orthodox Christian traditions, such as Slavas and Đurđevdan, and like Serbs they know their Onomastik or saint's days.

Gorani are Sunni Muslims and Sufism and in particular the Halveti and Bektashi Sufi orders are widespread.

Traditional Gorani folk music includes a two-beat dance called "oro" ('circle'), which is a circle dance focused on the foot movements: it always starts on the right foot and moves in an anti-clockwise direction. The Oro is usually accompanied by instruments such as curlje, kaval, čiftelija or tapan, and singing is used less frequently in the dances than in those of the Albanians and Serbs.

The "national" sport of Pelivona is a form of oil wrestling popular among Gorani with regular tournaments being held in the outdoors to the accompaniment of curlje and tapan with associated ritualized hand gestures and dances, with origins in the Middle East through the Ottoman Empire's conquest of the Balkans.

Another popular drink is Turkish coffee which is drunk in small cups accompanied by a glass of water. Tasseography is popular among all Gorani using the residue of Turkish coffee.

Language

The Gorani people speak South Slavic, a local dialect known as "Našinski" or "Goranski", which is part of a wider Torlakian dialect, spoken in Southern Serbia, Western Bulgaria and part of North Macedonia. The Slavic dialect of the Gorani community is known as Gorançe by Albanians. Within the Gorani community there is a recognition of their dialects being closer to the Macedonian language, than to Serbian.  The Torlakian dialect is a transitional dialect of Serbian and Bulgarian whilst also sharing features with Macedonian. The Gorani speech is classified as an Old-Shtokavian dialect of Serbian, the Prizren-Timok dialect.

Bulgarian linguists classify the Gorani dialect as part of a Bulgarian dialectal area. Despite not bordering Bulgaria and  being an Islamic nation, the Gorani are a target of Bulgarian irredentism on the belief that if the Gora dialect is Bulgarian, then all Macedonian dialects are Bulgarian. Illustrating the Bulgarian interest is the first Gorani–Albanian dictionary (with 43,000 words and phrases) in 2007 by Albanian-Gorani scholar Nazif Dokle, sponsored and printed by the Bulgarian Academy of Sciences. In this dictionary, Dokle defined the language as related to "the Bulgarian dialects spoken in the northwest" North Macedonia. 

Within scholarship, the Goran dialects previously classified as belonging to Serbian have been reassigned to Macedonian in the 21st century.

Gorani speech has numerous loan words, being greatly influenced by Turkish and Arabic due to the influence of Islam, as well as Albanian areally. It is similar to the Bosnian language because of the numerous Turkish loanwords. Gorani speak Serbo-Croatian in school.

According to the last 1991 Yugoslav census, 54.8% of the inhabitants of the Gora municipality said that they spoke the Gorani language, while the remainder had called it Serbian. Some linguists, including Vidoeski, Brozovic and Ivic, identify the Slavic-dialect of the Gora region as Macedonian. There are assertions that Macedonian is spoken in 50 to 75 villages in the Gora region (Albania and Kosovo). According to some unverified sources in 2003 the Kosovo government acquired Macedonian language and grammar books for Gorani school.

In 2008 the first issue of a Macedonian language newspaper, Гороцвет (Gorocvet) was published.

Verno libe

Gledaj me gledaj libe, abe verno libe,nagledaj mi se dur ti som ovde.Utre ke odim abe verno libe dalek-dalekna pusti Gurbet.Racaj poracaj libe šo da ti kupim.Ti da mi kupišabe gledaniku cerna šamija, ja da ga nosim
abe gledaniku i da ga želam.

Racaj poracaj abe verno
libe šo da ti pratim
Ti da mi pratiš abe
gledaniku šarena knjiga
Ja da ga pujem abe
gledaniku i da ga želam

Politics
 Unique Gorani Party
 Civic Initiative of Gora

Notable Gorani
 Fahrudin Jusufi, former Yugoslav footballer, born in Zli Potok
 Miralem Sulejmani, Serbian footballer, of Gorani descent
 Almen Abdi, Swiss footballer, of Gorani descent
 Zeli Ismail, English footballer born in Shishtavec 
 Zufer Avdija, former Israeli-Serbian basketball player, of Gorani descent
 Deni Avdija, Israeli NBA basketball player, of Gorani descent
 Danel Sinani, Luxembourgish footballer, of Gorani descent
 Veldin Hodža, Croatian footballer

See also 
 Torbeshi
 Pomaks
 Gorals

Notes

References

Sources

Books

Journals

 
 
 
Symposia

External links 

 
 
 
 
 
 Oberling, "Gurān", Encyclopædia Iranica, at http://www.iranicaonline.org/articles/guran

 
Ethnic groups in Kosovo
Ethnic groups in Serbia
Ethnic groups in North Macedonia
Ethnoreligious groups in Europe
Slavic ethnic groups
Slavic highlanders
Islam in North Macedonia
South Slavs
Muslim communities in Europe
Kukës